S.O.S. Eisberg (aka S.O.S. Iceberg and Iceland) is a 1933 German-US pre-Code drama film directed by Arnold Fanck and starring Gustav Diessl, Leni Riefenstahl, Sepp Rist, Gibson Gowland, Rod La Rocque, and Ernst Udet. The film was written by Tom Reed based on a story by Arnold Fanck and Friedrich Wolf.  S.O.S. Eisberg follows the account of the real-life Alfred Lothar Wegener polar expedition of 1929-30. Two members of the ill-fated Wegener expedition served as technical consultants to Universal.

Among the stars in S.O.S. Eisberg were Leni Riefenstahl, who had just made her directorial debut in The Blue Light (1932). Riefenstahl, in her last film as an actress, co-starred with Gustav Diessl and Ernst Udet in the German version S.O.S. Eisberg, and with Gibson Gowland and Rod La Rocque in the English version, S.O.S. Iceberg. Ernst Udet, a former German ace in the First World War, in a cameo performance, flew in both versions.

Plot of S.O.S. Eisberg
At a banquet at the International Society for Arctic Research, the members toast scientist Dr. Carl Lorenz (Gustav Diessl), about to recreate famed explorer Wegener's ill-fated expedition. Lawrence's team consists of two scientists, Dr. Johannes Brand (Sepp Rist) and Dr. Jan Matushek (Max Holzboer), his friend, Fritz Kuemmel (Walter Riml), their financial backer, John Dragan (Walter Riml), and their pilot to the Arctic, Lorenz's wife Hella (Leni Riefenstahl).

After Hella drops them at their base camp, the men begin their long trek to recover Wegener's records and prove his theories on ice floes. As the weeks pass, Brand and the others fear they will not survive when the ice breaks up, but Lorenz scoffs and refuses to wait until winter.

Early one morning, Lorenz sets out on his own. His companions fear he is lost. They find a hut Wegener occupied and a note from Lorenz saying that he is trying to reach a native village. Suddenly, the break up of the ice leaves their sleds of food supplies tumbling into a ravine. The rescuers take refuge on a huge iceberg where they discover that Lorenz is there, dazed and uncommunicative.

Brand begins sending out an S.O.S. on his wireless and Hella immediately leaves to search for her husband. Disaster strikes, with Dragan going mad, and as Kümmel fights with him to prevent their dog, Nakinak, from being killed, Kümmel falls to his death.

When Hella finds the survivors, she misjudges her landing and crashes but is able to swim to the iceberg. Brand seeing they are drifting out to sea, dives into the water, and is picked up by another pilot (Ernst Udet) following Hella's flight path. The pilot flies Brand to the nearby Inuit village.

Matushek sees two polar bears fighting over a seal but is killed when he tries to spear the bears. Dragan then attacks Hella, but by then her husband has come to his senses, and she is saved. The iceberg begins to come apart, throwing Dragan into the sea.

Lorenz, Hella and Nakinak are rescued by the Inuit. The three survivors later are aboard a ship bound for home, but Lorenz is haunted by the deaths incurred in his misguided expedition.

Cast
German version
 Gustav Diessl as Dr. Karl Lorenz
 Leni Riefenstahl as Hella Lorenz
 Sepp Rist as Dr. Johannes Krafft
 Ernst Udet as Ernst Udet
 Gibson Gowland as John Dragan
 Max Holzboer as Dr. Jan Matuschek 
 Walter Riml as Fritz Kümmel

English version
 Rod La Rocque as Dr. Carl Lawrence
 Leni Riefenstahl as Ellen Lawrence
 Sepp Rist as Dr. Johannes Brand
 Ernst Udet as Ernst Udet, flier
 Gibson Gowland as John Dragan
 Max Holzboer as Dr. Jan Matuschek
 Walter Riml as Fritz Kümmel
 Nakinak as Nakinak, the Inuit dog

Production
Under the working title Iceland, S.O.S. Eisberg was filmed on location in Umanak, on the west coast of Greenland, in Iceland, and in the Bernina Alps, on the border between Italy and Switzerland. Prior to principal photography, pre-production development and location shooting took a year.  The film's opening credits stated that it was produced "under the auspices of the Danish government and under the protectorate of the renowned polar explorer Knud Rasmussen.

A total of 38 men and women, three polar bears and two sea lions of the Hagenbeck circus making up the crew of the S.O.S. Eisberg boarded the Borodino at the end of June 1932. Filming was especially arduous with "Leni Riefenstahl, whose life he (Fanck) had often put in danger", after her repeated swimming in frigid waters, had to leave the production, "before the others, to be hospitalized in Copenhagen".

Modern sources have identified real dangers that occurred in the filming of S.O.S. Eisberg: "... none of the film's actors had doubles" and actors including Riefenstahl endured extreme cold and performed dangerous stunts. "... Udet nearly lost his life when his plane's engine lost power and crashed at the base of an iceberg. Udet was rescued by the Inuit, but minutes later, the iceberg which was supporting some of the crew crumbled to bits, casting men and equipment into the water below. The production unit ship anchored nearby was so shaken by the event that it nearly capsized, throwing people on board the deck into the water. All were rescued, but considerable sound equipment was destroyed."

Although "conceived and started by Germans", S.O.S. Eisberg was "turned over to Universal when the originators were unable to carry it through." Universal Studios made the decision to film simultaneously in German and English. Released by Universal Studios in both countries, with the German edition slightly longer with 10 additional minutes, the English version was retitled, S.O.S. Iceberg and released in the United States.

The highlights of the action included air crashes; the aircraft in S.O.S. Eisberg were:
 de Havilland 60 Genet Moth c/n 271, D-1651
 BFW M.23bW c/n 511, D-1970
 Klemm VL 26b c/n 278, D-2269
 Udet U 12b Spezial Flamingo D-822
 Junkers A 20 c/n 862, D-574

Aviation film historian James H. Farmer in Celluloid Wings: The Impact of Movies on Aviation (1984) noted, "... some outstanding, though brief aerial sequences are featured."

Reception
S.O.S. Eisberg premiered on 30 August 1933 in Berlin. The film was a box office disappointment for Universal.

Variety in their contemporary review of S.O.S. Iceberg noted, "The result is an authentic and authoritative series of polar pictures which scarcely need the pressbook assurance that no miniatures were used to supplement the straight shots."

See also
 List of German films 1933–1945

References

Notes

Citations

Bibliography

 Fanck, Arnold. S.O.S. Eisberg. Mit Dr. Fanck u. Ernst Udet in Groenland. Die Groenland-Expedition des Universal-Films S.O.S. Eisberg. München: F. BruckmannAG, 1933. OCLC 219890420.
 Farmer, James H. Celluloid Wings: The Impact of Movies on Aviation. Blue Ridge Summit, Pennsylvania: Tab Books Inc., 1984. .
 Paris, Michael. From the Wright Brothers to Top Gun: Aviation, Nationalism, and Popular Cinema. Manchester, UK: Manchester University Press, 1995. .
 Pendo, Stephen. Aviation in the Cinema. Lanham, Maryland: Scarecrow Press, 1985. .
 Riefenstahl, Leni. Leni Riefenstahl: A Memoir. New York: Picador, 1995. . 
 Riefenstahl, Leni. Kampf in Schee und Eis. Leipzig: Hesse und Bacher Verlag, 1933.
 Sorge, Ernst. With Plane, Boat, and Camera in Greenland: An Account of the Universal Dr. Fanck Greenland expedition. London: Hurst & Blackett, Ltd., 1935.

External links
  
  
 
 
 John Gallagher review of 2005 DVD released by Kino International

1933 films
American aviation films
1930s adventure drama films
American adventure drama films
German adventure drama films
Films of the Weimar Republic
Films of Nazi Germany
1930s German-language films
1930s English-language films
American multilingual films
Mountaineering films
German multilingual films
Films directed by Arnold Fanck
Films set in the Arctic
Films shot in Greenland
Films scored by Paul Dessau
1933 multilingual films
1933 drama films
1930s American films
1930s German films